Kancherla Keshava Rao, popularly known as KK (born 4 June 1939), is an Indian politician from Telangana Rashtra Samithi party. He is a Member of the Parliament of India in the Rajya Sabha, the upper house of the Indian Parliament. Rao was first elected to Rajya Sabha in 2006 and served until 2012, and was re-elected in 2014 representing Andhra Pradesh. Despite being from Telangana he was assigned to Andhra Pradesh because of the lot method used to assign Rajya Sabha members for the newly created Telangana and residual Andhra Pradesh. In 2020, he was re-elected to Rajya Sabha again for a six-year term representing Telangana.

Early life
He was born to K. Niranjan Rao and Govindamma in Mahbubabad, Warangal, Hyderabad State on 13 December 1940 ( official records 6, June, 1939 ). He did his B.Comm at Badruka College, then pursued an M.A. at Arts College, Osmania University and later PhD from Osmania University, Hyderabad.

Career
He started his career as a journalist, actor producer after a shot stint as teacher at Mahboob College MP High School. He was editor of The Daily News,a popular daily in English, printed from Hyderabad. He had his apprentice in the Indian Express, Vijayawada and The Patriot, Delhi. His writings were well received. He opposed the Emergency (1975–77), particularly the censorship of the media and The Daily News was blacklisted for it.

Rao has been a senior Congressmen, holding many high positions in the Party and Government. He and was elected as the President of the Andhra Pradesh Congress Committee (2005) and was later made the member of the Congress Working Committee, All India Congress Committee (AICC), in the year 2009. He was put in charge of Party affairs in four States: West Bengal, Jharkhand, Assam and Andaman & Nicobar Islands.

Rao was a Cabinet Minister in the three consecutive governments in the state of Andhra Pradesh, holding important portfolios like Education, Industry and Labor. Earlier Keshava Rao was Dy Chairman of the Legislative Council of Andhra Pradesh. He was elected to legislative council for two terms from Graduates constituency. He was also Chairman of the Minimum Wages Board and chairman of Rajiv Gandhi Technology Mission with cabinet rank.

He was elected to Rajya Sabha 2006–12. He was a great protagonist of Telangana and had Leftist leanings. In May 2013, Keshava Rao quit Indian National Congress, of which he was a senior person, as the party did not meet the deadline to take a decision on the issue of creation of a separate state of Telangana. He later joined the Telangana Rashtra Samithi, a regional Party which was spearheading the movement for creation of a separate state, along with two other members of Parliament. He was appointed as the Secretary General of Telangana Rashtra Samithi and its chairman of national affairs, as second in command. Dr. Rao was elected to Rajya sabha in 2014 from TRS Party for a six-year term. He was nominated as the Chairman (Leader) of the TRS Parliamentary Party, which was the eighth largest party in the Parliament with 12 members.

Rao was a prominent student leader and held elected positions both at the university and national level. He is a trade union leader. He led many peoples' movements like Backward classes and civil rights. Rao courted arrests by police many times and suffered detentions. He was a prominent politician, who was tipped for Chief Minister position in the first decade of this century, as quoted by Times of India and the local newspapers and TV channels.

He was the producer and screenplay writer of a National Award-winning feature film in Telugu, Nimajjanam in 1979.

In Parliament 
 Member, Marine Products Export Development Authority (MPEDA) (May 2006 - July 2009)
 Member, Committee on Commerce (June 2006 - May 2009) and (Aug. 2009 - 2010)
 Member, Consultative Committee for the Ministry of External Affairs (June 2006 - May 2009)
 Member, Board of Governors, Kendriya Vidyalaya Sangathan (June 2006 - April 2012)
 Member, Press Council of India (July 2006-Jan. 2011)
 Member, Committee on Rules (May 2008 - Sept. 2010)
 Member, Committee on Human Resource Development (May 2008 - May 2009) and (Aug. 2010 - April 2012)
 Member, Court of the University of Hyderabad (July 2008 - July 2011)
 Member, Consultative Committee for the Ministry of Home Affairs (Aug. 2009 - April 2012)
 Member, Committee on Subordinate Legislation (Sept. 2014–Present))
 Member, Committee on Food, Consumer Affairs and Public Distribution (Oct. 2014 onwards)
 Member, Rajya Sabha's Forum on Panchayati Raj (Feb. 2016 onwards)

Books published 
 New Deal to Education, 1984
 Social Philosophy in Recent Indian Thought, 1987

Personal life
He is married to Vasantha Kumari and has two sons and two daughters.

Awards 
 Global Association of Universal Peace ( GAUP ) announced its inaugural International Prize to Dr. Kancherla Kheshava Rao garu.

References

External links
 Profile on Rajya Sabha website

Indian National Congress politicians from Telangana
Telangana Rashtra Samithi politicians
Rajya Sabha members from Andhra Pradesh
Living people
1939 births
People from Hanamkonda district
Members of the Andhra Pradesh Legislative Council
Telugu politicians
Telangana politicians